Rhian Edwards is a Welsh poet. Her debut collection of poetry, Clueless Dogs, was named the Wales Book of the Year in 2013.

Biography
Edwards was born in Bridgend, Wales, and moved to Derbyshire, England while she was in primary school. She studied a bachelor's degree in law at the London School of Economics and, after completing a master's degree, began working as a tax consultant. After failing one of her tax exams, she left her job as a tax consultant to work for the Financial Times; she sold advertising space in the newspaper but hoped to join its editorial staff. She began writing poetry after meeting a group of poets in London and attending a performance night at the Covent Garden Poetry Café. She was also a singer and songwriter before becoming a full-time writer.

Parade the Fib, a pamphlet of Edwards' poems, was published by Tall Lighthouse and was listed as a Poetry Book Society Choice in 2008. Her first book of poetry, titled Clueless Dogs, was published in 2012 by Seren Books. At the 2013 Wales Book of the Year Awards, Clueless Dogs won the overall prize for Wales Book of the Year, as well as the People's Choice Award and the Roland Mathias Prize for Poetry. It was also shortlisted for the 2012 Forward Prize for Best First Collection.

A prolific performer, Edwards has given over 400 poetry readings at festivals, on radio, and on stage, and won the John Tripp Award for Spoken Poetry in 2011–2012. In 2013, she became the first writer-in-residence at Aberystwyth Arts Centre. 
Edwards currently lives in Bridgend with her daughter.

Publications

Poetry
 2008: Parade the Fib, Tall Lighthouse
 2012: Clueless Dogs, Seren
 2017: Brood, Seren
 2020: The Estate Agent's Daughter, Seren

References

Living people
21st-century Welsh poets
21st-century Welsh women writers
21st-century Welsh writers
Welsh women poets
Alumni of the London School of Economics
People from Bridgend
Year of birth missing (living people)
Financial Times people